Christian Center is an unincorporated community in Christian County in the Ozarks of southwest Missouri, United States.

Highlandville is approximately three miles west on U.S. Route 65 and Ozark is about six miles to the north-northwest. To the east and south lie the rugged topography of Bull Creek and a section of the Mark Twain National Forest.

References

Unincorporated communities in Christian County, Missouri
Unincorporated communities in Missouri